The Livermore Valley AVA is an American Viticultural Area in Alameda County, California, surrounding the city of Livermore in the Tri-Valley region.  Both the AVA and the city are named after Robert Livermore, a landowner whose holdings encompassed the valley.  The groundwater basin underlying the valley is the Livermore Basin, the largest sub-unit of which is the Mocho Subbasin.  The Livermore Basin is one of five aquifers in the San Francisco Bay Area that supply most of the metropolitan Bay Area population.  The entire Livermore Basin aquifer faces a concern over elevated total dissolved solids by the year 2020 due to an expanding human population leading to higher rates of return water flows to the aquifer containing certain salts.

Wine production
Wine has been cultivated in Livermore since the 19th century, with the Cresta Blanca Winery (founded 1882) being one of the earliest, and well-respected, with its first vintage (1884) winning Grand Prix at the 1889 Paris Exposition, becoming the first California wine to win a competition in France. Vineyards were shuttered during Prohibition, however, with the exception of two wineries, Concannon and Wente.

In the early 1960s, Livermore had as much area under vine as Napa Valley did at that time. However, it remained relatively unknown, while Napa rose to worldwide prominence.  Wente Vineyards has long been the largest producer in the Livermore Valley, making around 700,000 cases of wine annually with wholesale, tasting room and export sales. It was first established in the valley in 1883 and is now the oldest family owned continuously operated winery in the United States.  The other large producer, Concannon Vineyard, was also established in 1883 and their wines are available nationally along with a tasting room for direct sales. Others are Raindrop Wine which also operates under Misson Wines, Murrieta's Well, The Winemakers' Studio, Steven Kent Winery, Wood Family Vineyards, McGrail Vineyards, Cuda Ridge Winery, Retzlaff Winery, Fenestra Winery, Occasio Winery, Stony Ridge/Crooked Vine Cellars, Longevity Wines, Rodrigue Molyneaux Winery, 3 Steves Winery, Rosa Fierro Cellars, Big White House/John Evan Cellars, Charles R Vineyards, Garre' Winery, Ehrenberg Cellars, The Singing Winemaker, Chouinard Vineyards, Elliston Vineyards, Las Positas Vineyards, Dante Robere Vineyards, Ruby Hill Winery, Rubino Estates, Bodegas Aguirre, Nottingham Cellars, Vasco Urbano Wine Company, Page Mill Winery, Bent Creek Winery and Nella Terra Cellars.

Livermore possesses a predominately gravel based soil and lies on a unique east-west orientation, unlike many other winegrowing valleys. Due to a reliable onshore afternoon/evening breeze off of the San Francisco Bay a wide fluctuation in temperature between sites and a large diurnal temperature swing occur. Livermore Valley is considered a Winkler Region III grape growing zone with temperatures comparable to northern Napa Valley appellations such as St. Helena or Calistoga.

The relatively obscure Petite Sirah grape produced Livermore's best historically known red wine, although the climate also makes for interesting dessert wines as well as excellent Cabernet Sauvignon, Merlot, Sangiovese, and Rhone varieties. The original plantings of Sémillon and Sauvignon blanc were cuttings taken from Château d'Yquem, and those grapes tend to produce fine wine in the Livermore area. There is also a move afoot among the wineries in Livermore to specialize in Chardonnay, Sauvignon Blanc, Merlot, Cabernet Sauvignon, and some other mostly Bordeaux varieties. Wine made from grapes grown in the Livermore Valley is eligible for the Livermore Valley AVA, San Francisco Bay AVA, and Central Coast AVA appellation of origin designations.

Wineries and vineyards 
3 Steves Winery 
Bent Creek Winery
Big White House Winery and John Evan Cellars
Caddis Wines
Concannon Vineyard
Cuda Ridge Wines
Misson Wines
Nella Terra Cellars
Nottingham Cellars
Occasio Winery
Omega Road Winery
Page Mill Winery
Raindrop Winery
Rios-Lovell Winery
Rodrigue Molyneaux Winery
Rosa Fierro Cellars
Rubino Estates Winery
Ruby Hill Winery Winery
The Steven Kent Winery
Wente Vineyards

Where to Buy California Wine Grapes 
Grapesforwine.com
Grapemust.com
Grapebuckets.com
Baywinebrokers.com

Photo gallery

See also 
Bernal Subbasin
Mocho Subbasin
Pleasanton Fault
Tesla Fault

References

External links 

American Viticultural Areas of the San Francisco Bay Area

 
Geography of Alameda County, California
Livermore, California
Tourist attractions in Alameda County, California
1982 establishments in California
American Viticultural Areas of California
American Viticultural Areas